Red House is a small unincorporated community in Charlotte County, Virginia, United States.

References

Unincorporated communities in Charlotte County, Virginia
Unincorporated communities in Virginia